A Collection is a greatest hits album by Third Eye Blind, released July 18, 2006.  The album contains all of their singles (with the exception of "Anything"), a handful of fan and band favorites, as well as three unreleased-via-LP songs: "Tattoo of the Sun", "My Time in Exile" and "Slow Motion" (with lyrics). The package also includes liner notes from renowned rock writer James Hunter and track-by-track commentary from Stephan Jenkins.

Critical reception

Stephen Thomas Erlewine of AllMusic was critical of the length of the album, commenting that the album captures Third Eye Blind's "early way with a hook as skillfully as their descent into unbearable pomposity".

Commercial performance
A Collection peaked at #103 on the Billboard 200, staying on the chart for three weeks.

Track listing

Rejected options 
An acoustic version of "Anything" (the only single that did not make the cut) was replaced by "Can't Get Away", likely due to its short-length and to even the number of songs from each album.  Remixes of "Losing a Whole Year" and "Graduate" and a 1995 demo of "Semi-Charmed Life" were dropped in favor of the original studio recordings, likely done in order to appeal to a traditional audience.  The track list was also in a different order:

 "Semi-Charmed Life (1995 Demo)"
 "Losing A Whole Year (Remix - Strings Up)"
 "How's It Going To Be"
 "Jumper"
 "Graduate (Remix)"
 "Tattoo Of The Sun"
 "Never Let You Go"
 "Deep Inside Of You"
 "Anything (Acoustic)"
 "10 Days Late"
 "Blinded"
 "Crystal Baller"
 "My Time In Exile"
 "God Of Wine"
 "Motorcycle Drive By"
 "Forget Myself"
 "Wounded"
 "Palm Reader"
 "Slow Motion (With Lyrics)"

References 

Third Eye Blind albums
2006 compilation albums
2006 greatest hits albums
Rhino Records compilation albums